John Fletcher Moulton, Baron Moulton,  (18 November 1844 – 9 March 1921) was an English mathematician, barrister, judge and Liberal politician. He was a Cambridge Apostle.

Early life
Moulton was born in Madeley, Shropshire, England, as one of six children of a scholarly minister of the Wesleyan Methodist Church, James Egan Moulton. He was sent to Kingswood School at the age of 11 where he excelled at academic subjects. He achieved the top marks in the Oxford and Cambridge Local Examinations and achieved a scholarship to St John's College, Cambridge, graduating Senior Wrangler in 1868 and winning the Smith's Prize. He was at one point judged to be one of the twelve most intelligent men in the United Kingdom.

Career
After a brilliant mathematical career at Cambridge and election to a Fellowship, Moulton became a London barrister, specialising in patent law.  He also experimented on electricity and was elected a Fellow of the Royal Society. A great advocate for medical research, he was the first chair of the Medical Research Council. He was awarded the French Legion of Honour for his work in establishing international units for measuring electricity.

Moulton also corresponded with Charles Darwin.

Moulton became a Liberal Party Member of Parliament successively for Clapham 1885–86, South Hackney 1894–95, and Launceston 1898–1906. He backed the attempts of Gladstone to solve the problems in Ireland through Irish Home Rule. In 1906 Moulton was made Lord Justice on the Court of Appeal and Privy Councillor. In 1912 he entered the House of Lords with a life peerage and the title, created on 1 October, Baron Moulton, of Bank in the County of Southampton.

The First World War gave Lord Moulton his greatest challenge. In 1914 he became chairman of a committee to advise on the supply of explosives, a difficult problem because the British had only a feeble organic chemistry industry.  Before long Moulton became Director-General of the Explosives Department, first in the War Office and later in the Ministry of Munitions. He mobilised a brilliant group of administrators and scientists who expanded production more than 20-fold— throughout the war there was more explosives than shells to hold them.  They also made fertilizers, and in 1917 became responsible for producing poisonous gases. Though loyal to orders, Moulton believed that poison gas was a departure from civilised warfare.

During the entire four war years Lord Moulton worked a ten-hour day and took less than ten days holiday. At weekends he drove about the country to inspect munitions plants and to locate sites for new ones. He was awarded the Knight Commander of the Order of the Bath in 1915, the Knight Grand Cross of the Order of the British Empire in 1917, the Etoile Noir of France, the Order of Leopold (Belgium) and was the last person to receive the Order of the White Eagle before the collapse of the Russian monarchy.

After the war, despite pressure to lead the expansion of the British chemical industry, he returned to his love: the law.  He died in London on 9 March 1921.

In July 1924, ''The Atlantic## published an impromptu speech Lord Moulton had given at the Authors' Club in London a few years prior to his death: "Law and Manners." In it, he addresses "the domain of Obedience to the Unenforceable."

Family 
He married Clara Thomson née Hertz (widow of Robert William Thomson) on 24 April 1875. She died in 1888.

Arms

See also
 Rev. Dr. James Hope Moulton, nephew
 Rev. Dr. William Fiddian Moulton, brother
Rev. Dr. James Egan Moulton, brother
Dr. Richard Green Moulton, brother
Rev. James Egan Moulton Jr, nephew

Notes

External links

 
Speech, from John Silber about John Fletcher Moulton (1995)
 Notes Rec. R. Soc. 20 December 2009 vol. 63 no. 4 355–363, "John Fletcher Moulton and Guglielmo Marconi: bridging science, Law and industry
 Science and War (Rede Lecture, 1919)

1844 births
1921 deaths
20th-century English judges
English mathematicians
Alumni of St John's College, Cambridge
Presidents of the Cambridge Union
Law lords
Fellows of the Royal Society
People educated at Kingswood School, Bath
Hackney Members of Parliament
UK MPs 1885–1886
UK MPs 1892–1895
UK MPs 1895–1900
UK MPs 1900–1906
UK MPs who were granted peerages
John Fletcher
Members of the Parliament of the United Kingdom for English constituencies
Senior Wranglers
Members of the Judicial Committee of the Privy Council
Members of the Parliament of the United Kingdom for Launceston
Members of London County Council

Knights Commander of the Order of the Bath
Knights Grand Cross of the Order of the British Empire
Members of the Privy Council of the United Kingdom
Life peers created by George V